Ewa Dederko (born May 19, 1974 in Blachownia) is a triathlete from Poland, who competed at the 2008 Summer Olympics in Beijing. Dederko placed thirtieth in the women's triathlon with a time of 2:05:09.

At the peak of her career, Dederko took part in more than 50 ITU and ETU competitions, and had achieved twenty top-ten finishes. Her best results happened in 2002, when she claimed the gold medal at the ITU European Triathlon Cup in Sofia, Bulgaria. She is also a twelve-time Polish triathlon champion.

References

External links
 ITU Profile

1974 births
Living people
Triathletes at the 2008 Summer Olympics
Olympic triathletes of Poland
Polish female triathletes
People from Częstochowa County
Sportspeople from Silesian Voivodeship